Malé Borové is a village and municipality in Liptovský Mikuláš District in the Žilina Region of northern Slovakia.

History 
In historical records the village was first mentioned in 1550.

Geography 
The municipality lies at an altitude of 880 metres and covers an area of 5.835 km². It has a population of about 205 people.

References

External links 
 
 
 https://web.archive.org/web/20070513023228/http://www.statistics.sk/mosmis/eng/run.html

Villages and municipalities in Liptovský Mikuláš District